Disinvestment (or divestment) from South Africa was first advocated in the 1960s, in protest against South Africa's system of apartheid, but was not implemented on a significant scale until the mid-1980s. The disinvestment campaign, after being realised in federal legislation enacted in 1986 by the United States, is credited by some as pressuring the South African Government to embark on negotiations ultimately leading to the dismantling of the apartheid system.

United Nations campaigns

In November 1962, the United Nations General Assembly passed Resolution 1761, a non-binding resolution establishing the United Nations Special Committee against Apartheid and called for imposing economic and other sanctions on South Africa. All Western nations were unhappy with the call for sanctions and as a result, boycotted the committee.

Following this passage of this resolution the UK-based Anti-Apartheid Movement (AAM) spearheaded the arrangements for an international conference on sanctions to be held in London in April 1964. According to Arianna Lisson, "The aim of the Conference was to work out the practicability of economic sanctions and their implications on the economies of South Africa, the UK, the US, and the Protectorates. Knowing that the strongest opposition to the application of sanctions came from the West (and within the West, Britain), the Committee made every effort to attract as wide and varied a number of speakers and participants as possible so that the Conference findings would be regarded as objective."

The conference was named the International Conference for Economic Sanctions Against South Africa. This conference, Lisson writes,
established the necessity, the legality, and the practicability of internationally organised sanctions against South Africa, whose policies were seen to have become a direct threat to peace and security in Africa and the world. Its findings also pointed out that in order to be effective, a programme of sanctions would need the active participation of Britain and the US, who were also the main obstacle to the implementation of such a policy.

Attempts to persuade British policymakers
The conference was not successful in persuading Britain to take up economic sanctions against South Africa though. Rather, the British government "remained firm in its view that the imposition of sanctions would be unconstitutional 'because we do not accept that this situation in South Africa constitutes a threat to international peace and security and we do not, in any case, believe that sanctions would have the effect of persuading the South African Government to change its policies".

The AAM tried to make sanctions an election issue in the 1964 General Election in Britain. Candidates were asked to state their position on economic sanctions and other punitive measures against the South African government. Most candidates who responded answered in the affirmative. After the Labour Party sweep to power though, commitment to the anti-apartheid cause dissipated. In short order, Labour Party leader Harold Wilson told the press that his Labour Party was "not in favour of trade sanctions partly because, even if fully effective, they would harm the people we are most concerned about – the Africans and those white South Africans who are having to maintain some standard of decency there". Even so, Lisson writes that the "AAM still hoped that the new Labour Government would be more sensitive to the demands of public opinion than the previous Government." But by the end of 1964, it was clear that the election of the Labour Party had made little difference in the government's overall unwillingness to impose sanctions.

Steadfast rejection by the United Kingdom
Lisson summarizes the situation at the UN in 1964:
At the UN, Britain consistently refused to accept that the situation in South Africa fell under Chapter VII of the [United Nations] Charter. Instead, in collaboration with the US, it worked for a carefully worded appeal on the Rivonia and other political trials to try to appease Afro-Asian countries and public opinion at home and abroad; by early 1965 the issue of sanctions had lost momentum.
According to Lisson, Britain's rejection was premised on its economic interests in South Africa, which would be put at risk if any type of meaningful economic sanctions were put in place.

1970s
In 1977, the voluntary UN arms embargo became mandatory with the passing of United Nations Security Council Resolution 418.

An oil embargo was introduced on 20 November 1987 when the United Nations General Assembly adopted a voluntary international oil embargo.

United States campaign (1977–1989)

The Sullivan Principles (1977)

Richard Knight writes that the anti-apartheid movement in the U.S. found that Washington was unwilling to get involved in economically isolating South Africa. The movement responded by organized lobbying of individual businesses and institutional investors to end their involvement with or investments in the apartheid state as a matter of corporate social responsibility. This campaign was coordinated by several faith-based institutional investors eventually leading to the creation of the Interfaith Center on Corporate Responsibility. An array of celebrities, including singer Paul Simon, also participated.

The key instrument of this campaign was the so-called Sullivan Principles, authored by and named after the Rev. Dr. Leon Sullivan. Leon Sullivan was an African-American preacher in Philadelphia who, in 1977, was also a board member of the corporate giant General Motors. At that time, General Motors was the largest employer of Blacks in South Africa. The principles required that the corporation ensure that all employees are treated equally and in an integrated environment, both in and outside the workplace, regardless of race, as a condition of doing business. These principles directly conflicted with the mandated racial discrimination and segregation policies of apartheid-era South Africa, thus making it impossible for businesses adopting the Sullivan Principles to continue doing business there.

While the anti-Apartheid movement lobbied individual businesses to adopt and comply with the Sullivan Principles, the movement opened an additional front with institutional investors. Besides advocating that institutional investors withdraw any direct investments in South African-based companies, anti-Apartheid activists also lobbied for the divestment from all U.S.-based companies having South African interests who had not yet adopted the Sullivan Principles. Institutional investors such as public pension funds were the most susceptible to these types of lobbying efforts.

Public companies with South African interests were thus confronted on two levels: First, shareholder resolutions were submitted by concerned stockholders who, admitted, posed more of a threat to the often-cherished corporate reputations than to the stock price. Second, the companies were presented with a significant financial threat whereby one or more of their major institutional investors decides to withdraw their investments.

Achieving critical mass (1984–1989)

The disinvestment campaign in the United States, which had been in existence for quite some years, gained a critical mass following the Black political resistance to the 1983 South African constitution which included a "complex set of segregated parliaments". Richard Knight writes:
In a total rejection of apartheid, black South Africans mobilized to make the townships ungovernable, black local officials resigned in droves, and the government declared a State of Emergency in 1985 and used thousands of troops to quell "unrest". Television audiences throughout the world were to watch almost nightly reports of massive resistance to apartheid, the growth of a democratic movement, and the savage police and military response.

The result of the widely televised South African response was "a dramatic expansion of international actions to isolate apartheid, actions that combined with the internal situation to force dramatic changes in South Africa's international economic relations".

Higher education endowments
Students organised a demand that their colleges and universities divest, meaning that the universities were to cease investing in companies that traded or had operations in South Africa. At many universities, many students and faculty protested in order to force action on the issue. The first organised Anti-Apartheid Organization on University Campuses in the United States was CUAA founded at the University of California Berkeley by Ramon Sevilla. Sevilla was a principal organiser that had support from Nelson Mandela, with whom Sevilla was in communication while Mandela was imprisoned at Maximum Security Prison, Robben Island as well as with The African National Congress (the ANC) for committing 196 acts of public violence against apartheid.

Some of the most effective actions in support of the divestment of University investments in U.S. companies doing business in South Africa took place between the years of 1976–1985, as Sevilla travelled throughout the American Continent and Europe gathering support for the overthrow of the South African Apartheid Government, which also led to his arrest at U.C. Berkeley on several occasions in the successful effort to force the University of California to divest all of their investments in companies doing business in South Africa, which also became the driving force for divestment worldwide in all companies doing business in the country of Apartheid South Africa. For example, in April 1986, 61 students were arrested after building a shantytown in front of the chancellor's office at UC Berkeley. A South Africa divestment activist at Occidental College in Los Angeles was future US president Barack Obama.

As a result of these organised "divestment campaigns", the boards of trustees of several prominent universities voted to divest completely from South Africa and companies with major South African interests.

The first of these was Hampshire College in 1977.

These initial successes set a pattern that was later repeated and many more campuses across the country. Activism surged in 1984 on the wave of public interest created by the wide television coverage of the then-recent resistance efforts of the black South Africans.

Overall, according to Knight's analysis, the numbers year over year for educational institutions fully or partially divesting from South Africa were:

Michigan State University
The anti-Apartheid disinvestment campaign on campuses began on the West Coast and Midwest in 1977 at Michigan State University and Stanford University. It had some early successes in 1978 at Michigan State University, which voted for total divestiture, at Columbia University; and the University of Wisconsin–Madison. Following the Michigan State University divestiture in 1978, in 1982, the State of Michigan Legislature and Governor voted for divestiture by all of the more than 30 State of Michigan colleges and universities, an action later struck down as unconstitutional by the Michigan Court of Appeals in response to a suit against the Act by the University of Michigan.

Columbia University
The initial Columbia divestment, focused largely on bonds and financial institutions directly involved with the South African regime. It followed a year-long campaign first initiated by students who had worked together to block the appointment of former Secretary of State Henry Kissinger to an endowed chair at Columbia University in 1977. Broadly backed by a diverse array of student groups and many notable faculty members the Committee Against Investment in South Africa held numerous teach-ins and demonstrations through the year focused on the trustees' ties to the corporations doing business with South Africa. Trustee meetings were picketed and interrupted by demonstrations culminating in May 1978 in the takeover of the Graduate School of Business.

Smith College
Smith College, in Northampton, Massachusetts, which is connected to Hampshire College in Amherst, Massachusetts, through the Five College Consortium engaged with divesting from South Africa several years later. In the spring semester of 1986 students at Smith College protested the board of trustees' decision not to fully divest the college's endowment from companies in South Africa. Student protests included a sit-in in College Hall, the main administrative office which included nearly 100 students sleeping in overnight on 24 February 1986. The next day students staged a full blockade of the building, not allowing any staff into the building and anticipating arrest, though the president of the college at the time, Mary Maples Dunn, refused to have the students arrested. 

A comprehensive list of the demands they made throughout the demonstration was published on 28 February 1986. The "Women at College Hall" agreed to end the blockade of The Board of Trustees agreed to "issue a statement of intent to deliberate again, with a quorum, the issue of divestment" before Spring Break, and that the Investor Responsibility Committee would meet with representatives from the South African Task Force, the Ethical Investment Committee, and students from the Divestment Committee to look at "a restructuring of the investment policy". Students also demanded that the Board of Trustees "recognize the need for more dialogue with the Smith College community" and that they act on this with more meetings and transparency. In relation to the action, students demanded that a required teach-in be conducted to educate the college and the Board of Trustees on divestment, South African apartheid, and the College Hall Occupation, in addition, a booklet would be compiled by the demonstrators that would be distributed to the college to educate the community on the movement. They also demanded that the president grant amnesty to anyone who directly or indirectly participated in the occupation.

On 1 March 1986, the protest ended when negotiations with administrators led to an agreement that the trustees would re-evaluate their decision, a mandatory teach-in would be held, and amnesty would be granted to anyone involved in the demonstration. After student pressures, Smith College voted to divest all $39 million in stocks that they held in companies working in South Africa by 31 October 1988.

Harvard University
Harvard University only undertook a partial "divestment" from South Africa and only after significant resistance. Adam Soften and Alan Wirzbicki give this description:
Throughout the 1980s, Harvard professors for the most part avoided involvement with South Africa in protest of apartheid, and then president Derek C. Bok was a vocal supporter of work by the U.S. to prompt reform in South Africa. But the University was slow to pull its own investments out of companies doing business in South Africa, insisting that through its proxy votes, it could more effectively fight apartheid than by purging stocks from its portfolio. But after a decade of protests, Harvard did adopt a policy of selective divestment, and by the end of the 1980s was almost completely out of South Africa.

University of California
At the University of California Berkeley campus, student organizations focused on a campaign of civil disobedience, with 38 students arrested in 1984, a semester-long sit-in protest with 158 arrests in 1985, and a shantytown protest 1–4 April 1986 that resulted in a violent confrontation between protesters and police and 152 arrests.

The University of California, in contrast to the limited action undertaken by Harvard, authorized in 1986 the withdrawal of three billion dollars worth of investments from the apartheid state. Nelson Mandela stated his belief that the University of California's massive divestment was particularly significant in abolishing white-minority rule in South Africa.

Gettysburg College 
In 1989, after a three-year review by the Gettysburg College Board of Trustees and a five-month campaign by the Salaam Committee—a campus group made up of students and faculty—the college voted to divest $5.4 million from companies connected to South Africa.

States and cities

In addition to campuses, anti-apartheid activists found concerned and sympathetic legislators in cities and states. Several states and localities did pass legislation ordering the sale of such securities, notably the City and County of San Francisco, which passed legislation on 5 June 1978 not to invest "in corporations and banks doing business in or with South Africa". The result was that "by the end of 1989 26 states, 22 counties and over 90 cities had taken some form of binding economic action against companies doing business in South Africa". Many public pension funds connected to these local governments were legislated to disinvestment from South African companies. These local governments also exerted pressure via enacting selective purchasing policies, "whereby cities give preference in bidding on contracts for goods and services to those companies who do not do business in South Africa".

Nebraska
Nebraska was the first US state to divest from South Africa. The divestment was initiated by Ernie Chambers, the only Black member of the Nebraska legislature. Chambers was angered when he learned that the University of Nebraska had received a donation of several hundred gold Krugerrands. He introduced a nonbinding resolution calling for state pension funds that had been invested directly or indirectly in South Africa to be invested elsewhere. It became state law in 1980.

According to Knight, the beginning of divestment in Nebraska caused little immediate change in business practices; David Packard of Hewlett Packard stated "I'd rather lose business in Nebraska than with South Africa." The impact was magnified as other US state governments took similar measures through the 1980s. Nebraska passed stronger legislation in 1984, mandating divestment of all funds from companies doing business in South Africa. This resulted in the divestment of $14.6 million in stocks from Nebraska's public employee pension funds.

Federal involvement
The activity at the state and city level set the stage for action at the federal level.

Comprehensive Anti-Apartheid Act

This began when the Senate and House of Representatives presented Ronald Reagan with the Comprehensive Anti-Apartheid Act of 1986 which had been introduced by Congressman Ronald Dellums, supported by the members of the Congressional Black Caucus in the House, and piloted through the House by Congressman Howard Wolpe, chairman of the House Africa Subcommittee. Ronald Reagan responded by using his veto, but surprisingly and, in testament to the strength of the anti-Apartheid movement, the Republican-controlled Senate overrode his veto. Knight gives this description of the act:
The Act banned new U.S. investment in South Africa, sales to the police and military, and new bank loans, except for the purpose of trade. Specific measures against trade included the prohibition of the import of agricultural goods, textiles, shellfish, steel, iron, uranium, and the products of state-owned corporations.
The results of the act were mixed in economic terms according to Knight: Between 1985 and 1987, U.S. imports from South Africa declined 35%, although the trend reverses in 1988 when imports increased by 15%. Between 1985 and 1998, U.S. exports to South Africa increased by 40%.

Knight attributes some of the increase in imports in 1988 to lax enforcement of the 1986 Act citing a 1989 study by the General Accounting Office. Knight writes that a "major weakness of the Act is that it does little to prohibit exports to South Africa, even in such areas as computers and other capital goods".

Budget Reconciliation Act
A second federal measure introduced by Representative Charles Rangel in 1987 as an amendment to the Budget Reconciliation Act halted the ability of U.S. corporations from attaining tax reimbursements for taxes paid in South Africa. The result was that U.S. corporations operating in South Africa were subject to double taxation. According to Knight:
The sums of money involved are large. According to the Internal Revenue Service, taxes involved in 1982 were $211,593,000 on taxable income of $440,780,000. The U.S. Chamber of Commerce in South Africa has estimated that the measure increases the tax bill for U.S. companies from 57.5% to 72% of profits in South Africa.

Further legislative efforts
An additional and much harsher sanctions bill was passed by the House of Representatives (Congress) in August 1988. This bill mandated "the withdrawal of all U.S. companies from South Africa, the sale by U.S. residents of all investments in South African companies and an end to most trade, except for the import of certain strategic minerals". In the end, the bill didn't become law as wasn't able to pass the Senate. (In the United States legislative system a bill must be passed by both the Senate and the House of Representatives before it can be signed into law by the President.) Even so, the fact that such a harsh bill made any progress at all through the legislature "alerted both the South African government and U.S. business that significant further sanctions were likely to be forthcoming" if the political situation in South Africa remained unchanged.

Effects on South Africa

Economic effects

While post-colonial African countries had already imposed sanctions on South Africa in solidarity with the Defiance Campaign, these measures had little effect because of the relatively small economies of those involved. The disinvestment campaign only impacted South Africa after the major Western nations, including the United States, got involved beginning in mid-1984. From 1984 onwards, according to Knight, because of the disinvestment campaign and the repayment of foreign loans, South Africa experienced considerable capital flight. The net capital movement out of South Africa was:
 R9.2 billion in 1985
 R6.1 billion in 1986
 R3.1 billion in 1987
 R5.5 billion in 1988

The capital flight triggered a dramatic decline in the international exchange rate of the South African currency, the rand. The currency decline made imports more expensive which in turn caused inflation in South Africa to rise at a very steep 12–15% per year.

The South African government did attempt to restrict the damaging outflow of capital. Knight writes that "in September 1985 it imposed a system of exchange control and a debt repayments standstill. Under exchange control, South African residents are generally prohibited from removing capital from the country and foreign investors can only remove investments via the financial rand, which is traded at a 20% to 40% discount compared to the commercial rand. This means companies that disinvest get significantly fewer dollars for the capital they withdraw."

Anti-apartheid opposition
While disinvestment, boycotts, and sanctions aimed at the removal of the apartheid system, there was also considerable opposition from within the anti-apartheid movement within South Africa coming from both black and white leaders. Mangosuthu Buthelezi, Chief Minister of KwaZulu and president of the Inkatha Freedom Party slammed sanctions, stating that "They can only harm all the people of Southern Africa. They can only lead to more hardships, particularly for the blacks." Well known anti-apartheid Members of Parliament Helen Suzman and Harry Schwarz also strongly opposed moves to disinvest from South Africa. Both politicians of the Progressive Federal Party, they argued that disinvestment would cause further economic hardships for black people, which would ultimately worsen the political climate for negotiations. Suzman described them as "self-defeating, wrecking the economy and do not assist anybody irrespective of race". Schwarz also argued that "Morality is cheap when someone else is paying."

Outside criticism
Many criticised disinvestment because of its economic impact on ordinary black South Africans, such as Prime Minister of the United Kingdom, Margaret Thatcher, who described sanctions and disinvestment as "the way of poverty, starvation and destroying the hopes of the very people – all of them—whom you wish to help." John Major, then her Foreign Secretary, said disinvestment would "feed white consciences outside South Africa, not black bellies within it", although in 2013, he said that the Conservative Government led by Margaret Thatcher was wrong to oppose tougher sanctions against South Africa during the apartheid era.

Many conservatives opposed the disinvestment campaign, accusing its advocates of hypocrisy for not also proposing that the same sanctions be leveled on either the Soviet Union or the People's Republic of China.

Libertarian Murray Rothbard also opposed this policy, asserting that the most-direct adverse impact of the boycott would actually be felt by the black workers in that country, and the best way to remedy the problem of apartheid was by promoting trade and the growth of free market capitalism in South Africa.

Ronald Reagan, who was the President of the United States during the time the disinvestment movement was at its peak, also opposed it, instead favoring a policy of "constructive engagement" with the Pretoria government. He opposed pressure from Congress and his own party for tougher sanctions until his veto was overridden.

See also
 Anti-Apartheid Movement
 Anti-Apartheid movement in the United States
 Academic boycotts of South Africa
 Boycott, Divestment and Sanctions
 Disinvestment
 Economic history of South Africa
 International sanctions during apartheid
 Northeast Coalition for the Liberation of Southern Africa
 Socially responsible investing
 Disinvestment from Iran
 Disinvestment from Israel

References

Further reading
 "For U.S. Firms in South Africa, The Threat of Coercive Sullivan Principles". Heritage Foundation. 12 November 1984.
 "On 'Constructive Engagement' in South Africa". The MIT Tech. 105(47). 5 November 1985.
 "The Choice for U.S. Policy in South Africa: Reform or Vengeance". Heritage Foundation. 25 July 1986.
 "Misconceptions about U.S. policy toward South Africa". US Department of State Bulletin. September 1986.
 Richard Knight. Chapter: "Sanctions, Disinvestment, and U.S. Corporations in South Africa". Sanctioning Apartheid (Africa World Press). 1990.
 "Disinvestment from South Africa: They Did Well by Doing Good". Contemporary Economic Policy. XV(1):76–86. January 1997.
 Robert Kinloch Massie, Loosing the Bonds: The United States and South Africa in the Apartheid Years, Doubleday, New York, 1997.

External links
 African Activist Archive – more than 7,000 documents, posters, T-shirts, buttons, photos, video, and memories of activism in the U.S. to support the struggles of African peoples against apartheid, colonialism, and social injustice, 1950s–1990s. Also includes a directory of African activist organizations across the U.S.
 Documenting the U.S. Solidarity Movement: With reflections on the sanctions and divestment campaigns
 U.S. Economic Involvement with Apartheid South Africa
 An Analysis of U.S. Disinvestment from South Africa: Unity, Rights, and Justice
 Black South African Opinion on Disinvestment
 The Crusade Against South Africa
 Inkatha Freedom Party – Inkatha and the disinvestment campaign
 Image of UCLA students in sit-down protest with banner reading "UC Out of South Africa! Divest Now" as two UC Police officers watch Los Angeles, California, 1986. Los Angeles Times Photographic Archive (Collection 1429). UCLA Library Special Collections, Charles E. Young Research Library, University of California, Los Angeles.

Boycotts of apartheid South Africa
International sanctions
South Africa–United States relations
Economy of South Africa
Disinvestment
Library of Congress Africa Collection related
Foreign trade of South Africa
Investment in South Africa